J’Kerian Morgan (born March 22, 1989), known professionally as Lotic, is an American electronic musician based in Berlin. Lotic rose to prominence through her involvement with the Janus Collective in the early 2010s as well as with a string of EPs released during this time. She was invited by Björk to produce two official Vulnicura remixes in 2016. Her full-length debut, Power, was released in 2018.

Early life 
Morgan was born and raised in southwest Houston, in what Mix magazine describes as a "strong black community". She began learning the alto saxophone at the age of 12 and played the instrument in marching band as a high school student. She earned her bachelor's degree at the University of Texas at Austin. Hoping to compose music for film, she started her studies as a film production major and switched to a film major after two years. During her time at UT Austin, she was involved in the university's Experimental and Electronic Music Studios as well as the Intellectual Entrepreneurship program, where she served as an Electronic Music Composition pre-grad intern.

Career

2009-2014: Early DJ career in Austin and Berlin  
Morgan first became interested in DJing in 2009 after seeing a Kingdom set while still a student at UT Austin. Her involvement with the KVRX student radio station marked the beginning of her own electronic music career as she frequently performed live DJ sets at station showcases and events around Austin. She released music during this time under Ben Aqua's #FEELINGS label.

After graduating college in 2012, Morgan moved to Berlin with her boyfriend to pursue a career in music while working for Ableton. Later that year, she became affiliated with the Janus Collective, a group described in The New York Times  as part of an enclave of American expatriates “taking over sleepy venues, creating their own parties and leaving a significant imprint on the city’s musical program.” Morgan became affiliated with Janus after meeting founders Dan D’Norch and Michael Ladner. The next year, she released the mixtape Fallout, which she followed with the Damsel in Distress mixtape in 2014.

2015-2017: Heterocetera, Agitations, collaborations 
Morgan released two EPs in 2015: Heterocetera and Agitations. 
In 2016, she was commissioned by Björk to produce two official remixes of "Notget" from Vulnicura; she also served as an opening act on the Berlin date of the Vulnicura Tour. That fall, she scored a promotional video for fashion brand ifeoma’s spring/summer 2017 collection. She also soundtracked the autumn/winter 2017 Julius Society show at Paris Fashion Week.

2018-2019: Power 
Her full-length debut, Power, was released in 2018. Accompanying this release was "Endless Power", an audio-visual production created in collaboration with lighting designer Emmanuel Biard. "Endless Power" was performed at Berlin's CTM Festival and Sónar in Barcelona. That year, she also performed in and scored "Embryogenesis" and "Fleshless Beast", dance pieces choreographed by Roderick George.

Along with Floating Points and Raven, Morgan scored the 2019 KDV Dance Ensemble performance piece "Las Casas Invisibles" choreographed by Kianí del Valle. She also contributed to a remix compilation of tracks from Polish cellist Resina's 2018 album Traces.

2020-present: Water 
In May 2020, Morgan announced a deal with Houndstooth Records after Tri Angle records shut down the previous month. Her release of the single "Burn a Print" coincided with the signing announcement. The following single, "Cocky", was released that August.

Lotic released the single “Come Unto Me” on August 17, 2021. That same day, she announced that her second studio album, Water, was to be released on October 29 of that year. The second single from Water, "Emergency", was released on September 21, 2021. Both singles were accompanied by music videos directed by Matt Lambert and Lil Internet, respectively.

Sparkling Water, an EP of four remixed tracks from Water accompanied by original brass arrangements, was announced in June 2022 with a release date set for the following month. "Always You (Sparkling)" was released as a single alongside this announcement.

Musical style 
Morgan's work as Lotic often addresses social and political issues. Although she now lives in Berlin, her work draws from the African American experience; her sound pays homage to ball culture and drumlines and the album Power was inspired in part by Between the World and Me by Ta-Nehisi Coates. She also explores gender in her music, naming an EP Heterocetera after encountering the term in the work of Audre Lorde. Pitchfork locates Lotic within the broader trend of "conceptronica" that arose in the 2010s, comparing her to artists like Elysia Crampton and Chino Amobi.

Stylistically, critics note the tension between softness and aggression in Lotic's music. Morgan herself considers her sound to have a more sensual edge than her "techno-centric" Berlin contemporaries. 2018's Power marked a stylistic shift for Lotic. Not only was it the first release incorporating Morgan's vocals, but critics noted a "gentler" musical approach compared to her previous, club-oriented releases.

Morgan cites Venus X of GHE20G0TH1K fame and Kingdom as influences.

Personal life 
Morgan is transgender, first announcing her transition in 2018. She has criticized the exclusive, "male-centric" nature of Berlin's queer scene and is vocal about racism and homophobia in the broader world of electronic music.

In 2017, Morgan was evicted from her apartment after the individual she subleased from did not pay the full rent. She worked on Power sporadically over the subsequent two-year period while experiencing homelessness.

Discography

Studio albums

Extended plays

Singles

Remixes

References 

American electronic musicians
Musicians from Houston
African-American musicians
American LGBT singers
LGBT African Americans
LGBT people from Texas
University of Texas at Austin alumni
LGBT DJs
1989 births
Living people
21st-century African-American people
20th-century African-American people
American expatriates in Germany
Music in Berlin
Transgender women musicians